Deivy Alexander Balanta Abonía (born 2 September 1993) is a Colombian footballer who plays as a central defender for Categoría Primera A club Millonarios.

References

External links

1993 births
Living people
Association football defenders
Colombian footballers
Colombia under-20 international footballers
Categoría Primera A players
Categoría Primera B players
Alianza Petrolera players
Atlético Nacional footballers
All Boys footballers
Atlético Junior footballers
Millonarios F.C. players
Colombian expatriate footballers
Expatriate footballers in Argentina
Footballers at the 2016 Summer Olympics
Olympic footballers of Colombia
Footballers from Bogotá